Volleyball at the 1992 Summer Olympics was represented by two events: men's team and women's team.

Medal table

Medal summary

References

External links
Official Olympic Report

 
O
1992 Summer Olympics events
1992
1992